Sergey Suslin (9 November 1944 – 1989) was a Soviet judoka and sambist. He competed in the men's lightweight event at the 1972 Summer Olympics.

Criminal activity and conviction
Since 1977, he worked as stuntman at the Lenfilm studio, playing minor roles in several Soviet action film. While there, together with other athletes who were employed as stuntmen at the Lenfilm, he took part in robberies and other criminal acts. In 1981, he was arrested and sentenced to 9 years in prison for the murder of his wife. He was released in 1989. He died the same year in Moscow after suffering a heart attack.

Suslin's case in the archives is still classified. Nowadays, a memorial judo sports tournament is being held in his honor.

Sources

References

External links
 

1944 births
1989 deaths
Soviet male judoka
Olympic judoka of the Soviet Union
Judoka at the 1972 Summer Olympics
Martial artists from Moscow
Sportspeople convicted of crimes
Uxoricides
Russian robbers
Soviet people convicted of murder